Redlands–Downtown station is a rail station serving downtown Redlands, California, United States. The station was built in 1910 for the Santa Fe Railroad and operated until 1938. The facility was preserved and reopened on October 24, 2022 as part of the Arrow service.

Service

Hours and frequency 
 

Redlands–Downtown is also served by one round-trip Metrolink weekday express train on the San Bernardino Line, with a western terminus of Los Angeles' Union Station.

Platforms 

Although they share a single track through the station, because Metrolink's cars have a different loading height than the Arrow vehicles, they board from different platforms. Metrolink trains board from a platform on the north side of the track, close to the parking garage. Arrow trains board from a platform on the south side of the track near the historic Santa Fe Depot.

Parking 
A four-level, 384-space parking structure was built north of the depot and opened in the summer of 2022 to replace the Redlands Mall parking lot that will be demolished in 2023.

Santa Fe Depot 
The station is adjacent to the Redlands Santa Fe Railroad Depot, which opened to passenger service in 1910 and is the centerpiece of the historic Redlands Santa Fe Depot District. The building's owner refurbished the structure in anticipation of service. The Arrow service will not directly utilize the old building, but new platforms and facilities were installed track side. The Red Car trolleys of the Pacific Electric Railway ran adjacent to the station on Orange Avenue until 1936.

References

External links 

Railway stations in the United States opened in 2022
Public transportation in San Bernardino County, California
Redlands, California
Railway stations in the United States opened in 1910
Railway stations closed in 1938
Former Atchison, Topeka and Santa Fe Railway stations in California
Metrolink stations in San Bernardino County, California
Arrow stations